Bothragonus swanii, the rockhead, deep-pitted poacher or deep-pitted sea-poacher, is a fish in the family Agonidae. It was described by Franz Steindachner in 1876, originally in the genus Hypsagonus. It is found in the eastern Pacific Ocean from Alaska to Carmel Bay, California down to depths of 18 metres. It can also inhabit the intertidal zone. Males can reach a maximum total length of 8.9 centimetres.

The species epithet "swanii" refers to James G. Swan of Port Townsend, Washington. The rockhead spawns nearshore, during the months of January–May in the California Current region. Its diet consists of benthic shrimp and crabs.

References

swanii
Fish described in 1876